Puerto Rican rapper and songwriter Residente has released one studio album, sixteen singles, and three music videos as soloist.

After 10 years working with his step-brother Eduardo Cabra "Visitante" on Calle 13, the group disbanded in 2015 and both members followed their respective careers solo. Residente took a DNA test that revealed his roots trace back to 10 different locations around the world, which inspired him to produce a studio album, a documentary, and a book released by Univision's Fusion Media Group under the same title Residente. He wrote and recorded the project over the course of two years in the countries where his roots are, including Siberia, Moscow, China, the Caucasus, France, Spain, England, Armenia, South Ossetia, Antigua, Ghana, Burkina Faso, Niger, Serbia, and Puerto Rico.

His first solo album Residente was released on March 31, 2017 and includes the singles "Somos Anormales" and "Desencuentro". The album peaked at number three in the US Latin Albums and at number one in the US World Albums charts. Residente also made his solo directorial debut and directed three music videos for the record. Residente was elected the best Latin album of 2017 by the critics of Billboard, as well as the 19th best album overall of the same year. It was also ranked 38th on Rolling Stones 50 Best Albums of 2017 list.

Albums

Singles

Featured singles

Other charted songs

Music videos

Featured music videos

Album appearances

See also
Calle 13 discography
List of awards and nominations received by Residente

Notes

References

Discographies of Puerto Rican artists
Discography
Latin music discographies